The Handball Federation of Nigeria (HFN) is the administrative and controlling body for handball and beach handball in Federal Republic of Nigeria. Founded in 1972, HFN is a member of African Handball Confederation (CAHB) and the International Handball Federation (IHF).

National teams
 Nigeria men's national handball team
 Nigeria men's national junior handball team
 Nigeria women's national handball team

References

External links
 Nigeria at the IHF website.
 Nigeria at the CAHB website.

Handball in Nigeria
Handball
Sports organizations established in 1972
1972 establishments in Nigeria
Handball governing bodies
African Handball Confederation
National members of the International Handball Federation
Organizations based in Lagos